Spice Girls Live at Wembley Stadium is the third video album by English girl group the Spice Girls. It was released on VHS on 24 November 1998 by Virgin Records, and was filmed at Wembley Stadium in London on 20 September 1998 during the Spiceworld Tour. The concert was first broadcast live in a pay-per-view special on Sky Box Office, and although the television broadcast was completely live, studio vocals were dubbed into several songs for the video version of the performance. It received a DVD release in the United Kingdom on 6 October 2008.

The show was recorded after Geri Halliwell left the band. Halliwell later revealed in the 2007 documentary film Giving You Everything that she watched the two-hour show from her home in the United Kingdom after only quitting the band four months prior and said "it was one of the hardest things I've ever had to do" and that it was "so painful", to which Mel B jokingly replied, "That's her own fault".

Set list
Act One
"Spiceworld Intro" 
"If U Can't Dance"
"Who Do You Think You Are" 
Act Two
"Something Kinda Funny"
"Do It"
"Too Much"
Act Three
"Stop"
"Where Did Our Love Go?" 
Act Four
"Love Thing"
Act Five
"The Lady Is a Vamp"
"Say You'll Be There"
Interlude 
"Naked"
Act Six
"2 Become 1"
Act Seven
"Sisters Are Doin' It for Themselves" 
"Wannabe"
"Spice Up Your Life"
"Mama"
Act Eight
"Viva Forever" 

Encore
"Never Give Up on the Good Times"
"We Are Family"

Personnel

Vocals
 Victoria Beckham
 Mel B
 Emma Bunton
 Melanie C

Band
 Simon Ellis – musical direction, keyboards
 Andy Gangadeen – drums
 Paul Gendler – guitars
 Fergus Gerrand – percussion
 Steve Lewinson – bass guitar
 Michael Martin – keyboards

Dancers
 Takao Baba
 Carmine Canuso
 Jimmy Gulzar
 Eszteca Noya
 Robert Nurse
 Louie Spence

Charts

Certifications

References

1998 live albums
1998 video albums
Live albums recorded at Wembley Stadium
Live video albums
 Pay-per-view events
Spice Girls video albums
Virgin Records live albums
Virgin Records video albums